Reginald James Lawrence (born April 12, 1970) is a former professional American football player who played wide receiver in 1993 for the Philadelphia Eagles.

External links
Pro-Football-Reference

1970 births
Living people
Camden High School (New Jersey) alumni
Players of American football from Camden, New Jersey
American football wide receivers
NC State Wolfpack football players
Philadelphia Eagles players